König von Kreuzberg is a German television series.

See also
List of German television series

External links
 

German comedy television series
Television shows set in Berlin
2005 German television series debuts
2005 German television series endings
German-language television shows
Sat.1 original programming